The Indiana Collegiate Hockey Conference is a collegiate hockey conference within Division 3 of the American Collegiate Hockey Association. The ICHC facilitates and fosters competitive, academic and operational excellence for its member institutions through the club sport of ice hockey. The conference supports a culture of professionalism and integrity all while creating a positive experience for the student-athletes and academic institutions it serves.

About 
The ICHC began play in the 2014-2015 season. All four teams participated in the ICHC Showcase, which were the first games in conference history, from October 10–12th, 2014. The showcase was hosted by IPFW. The first ICHC Playoffs took place from February 13-14th, 2015 and was hosted by Purdue.

Members

Maroon Conference

White Conference

Former members
Ball State University (2014-2019)
IPFW (2014-2018)
Xavier University (2015-2017) moved to ACHA Division II

Crossroads Cup Champions

References 
</

External links 
ACHA Web site

ACHA Division 3 conferences